is a Japanese footballer who plays for Wollongong United FC.

Career
Seiji Kawakami joined J3 League club Fukushima United FC in 2017.

Club statistics
Updated to 22 February 2018.

References

External links

Profile at Tochigi SC
Profile at Fujieda MYFC

1995 births
Living people
Sendai University alumni
Association football people from Tochigi Prefecture
Japanese footballers
Japanese expatriate footballers
J3 League players
Fukushima United FC players
Tochigi SC players
Fujieda MYFC players
SC Sagamihara players
Association football midfielders
Japanese expatriate sportspeople in Australia
Expatriate soccer players in Australia
Wollongong United FC players